was a Japanese actor and voice actor, represented by 81 Produce. He was best known for his roles as Nyarome in Mōretsu Atarō, Daisho in Himitsu no Akko-chan, Boss in Mazinger Z, Pāman 2 (Booby) in Pāman, King Nikochan in Dr. Slump, and Buta Gorilla in Kiteretsu Daihyakka. Ōtake died at the age of 90 on August 1, 2022, due to acute heart failure.

Voice roles

Cinematic animation
 Akira (Nezu)
 Jack and the Witch (Fox)
 Little Nemo: Adventures in Slumberland (Oompa)
 Neo Tokyo (444–1)
 Robin Hood (Otto)
Little Witch Academia: The Enchanted Parade (Mayor)

Television animation
 Kaibutsu-kun (Dracula)
 Kaibutsu-kun (TV) 2 (Bem)
 Kinnikuman (Nakano-san [eps. 50–58])
 Kiteretsu Daihyakka (Buta Gorilla, Ben)
 The Kabocha Wine (Monta Akai)
 Space Pirate Captain Harlock (Yattaran)
 Cyborg 009 (Albert Heinrich/004)
 Tatakae!! Ramenman (Janku)
 Doraemon (NTV anime) (Unknown role)
 Dokaben (Daigorō Unryū)
 Dr. Slump and Arale-chan (King Nikochan, Tsuruten Tsun)
 Dragon Ball (Carrot Master, Suke-san)
 Dragon Quest (Zanack)
 Police Academy: The Animated Series (Thomas 'House' Conklin)
 Pāman (Pāman 2 (Booby))
 Majokko Megu-chan (Papa Kanzaki, Crow, Boss)
 Bikkuriman (Black Zeus)
 Pani Poni Dash (Jijii)
 Himitsu no Akko-chan (original 1969 series) (Daisho)
 Hunter × Hunter (2011) (Zeno Zoldyck)
 Pokémon (Satoshi's Okorizaru, Hippie, Dr. Midorikawa)
 Mazinger Z (Boss)
 Maison Ikkoku (Saotome)
 Mōretsu Atarō (Nyarome)
 Maeterlinck's Blue Bird: Tyltyl and Mytyl's Adventurous Journey (Spirit of the Water)
 Yume Senshi Wingman (Doctor Anbaransu)
 Wakusei Robo Danguard A (Banta)
 Wansa-kun (Herahera)
 Majokko Tickle (Tontaro)
 Death Note (Roger Ruvie)
 Hustle Punch (Black)

Tokusatsu
 Robot Detective (Hikooman (ep. 7), Reitooman (ep. 18))
 Akumaizer 3 (Frangen (ep. 27))
 Chōriki Sentai Ohranger (Bara Clothes (ep. 23))
 Gekisō Sentai Carranger (President Gynamo)
 Gekisō Sentai Carranger vs. Ohranger (President Gynamo)
 Seijū Sentai Gingaman (Sutoijii (ep. 10))

Video games
 Asura's Wrath (The Golden Spider)
 Crash Bandicoot Gatchanko World (Ebeneezer Von Clutch) (Japanese dub)

Dubbing roles
Charlie and the Chocolate Factory (2008 NTV edition) (Grandpa George (David Morris))
The Empire Strikes Back (1980 Movie theater edition) (Major Bren Derlin (John Ratzenberger))

Awards

References

External links
 Official agency profile 
 
 
 

1932 births
2022 deaths
Japanese male video game actors
Japanese male voice actors
Male voice actors from Kanagawa Prefecture
81 Produce voice actors
Aoni Production voice actors